Daniel Roth is a luxury watch manufacturer based in the Vallée de Joux, in Switzerland. The company was created in 1989 and was acquired by the Bulgari Group in 2000.

Daniel Roth has workshops in Le Sentier as well as in Geneva, which it shares with its sister company Gerald Genta.

Daniel Roth is known for its complex and detailed watches, including a tourbillon with an 8-day power reserve, the instantaneous perpetual calendar and the Westminster Grande Sonnerie Carillon, which is the only automatic four-gong chiming wristwatch in production.

References

External links
Photos of Daniel Roth's Tourbillon Perpetual Calendar 
Ian Skellern on Quill & Pad: The Watch that changed my life: The Jean Daniel Nicolas Two-Minute Tourbillon by Mr. Daniel Roth

Watch brands
Watch manufacturing companies of Switzerland
Manufacturing companies established in 1989